Pharr-San Juan-Alamo (PSJA) Southwest High School is a public school in Pharr, Texas (United States). It is part of the Pharr-San Juan-Alamo Independent School District and is one of the district's six high schools.

Student demographics
As of the 2010–2011 school year, Southwest High School had a total of 351 students. 89.5% of the students are considered economically disadvantaged.

Attendance area and feeder patterns
The school's attendance boundary includes much of southern Pharr, including the Las Milpas area.

Feeder elementary schools include C. Anaya, Cesar Chavez, Escobar, Garcia, Kelly-Pharr, Palmer, and B. Palacios. The two feeder middle schools are Edward M. Kennedy and Jaime Escalante.

References

External links

 
 Pharr-San Juan-Alamo ISD

Pharr, Texas
Pharr-San Juan-Alamo Independent School District high schools